Jessica Crampton (born 1994) is a British female track cyclist.

Cycling career
Crampton became a three times British champion after successfully defending her Kerin Championship at the 2019 British National Track Championships. She had previously won a sprint title in 2017.

Family
She is the younger sister of Matthew Crampton.

References

1994 births
Living people
British female cyclists
British track cyclists
Sportspeople from Manchester
English track cyclists
21st-century British women